K48BL was a low-power television station co-licensed in Terrebonne and Bend, Oregon, broadcasting locally in analog on UHF channel 48 as an affiliate of Youtoo America. The station was owned by Rodney S. Johnson. While the station was co-licensed to Bend, its coverage area did not include Bend, as it used a directional antenna aimed at the north and south, towards Terrebonne, Redmond and Madras.

In addition to America One programs, K48BL broadcast locally originated programming, such as city council meetings, local special events, farm information, community programming, Public-access television, public affairs, specials, news, sports, weather, variety shows, logging, music videos and art profiles. Country music videos were also a large part of programming during the 1990s.

History
On March 7, 1986, the FCC issued a construction permit to Rodney S. Johnson to build K48BL, which first signed on on October 25, 1986.

External links 

48BL
Television channels and stations established in 1986
1986 establishments in Oregon
Defunct television stations in the United States
Television channels and stations disestablished in 2015
48BL